St Mary's College is a Roman Catholic primary and secondary school located in , Victoria, Australia, catering for students from F to Year 10. Established as St. Mary’s Convent School in 1900 by the Sisters of Mercy, the school went through a series of name changes from Sacred Heart College, and changes of site. In 1988 St. Mary’s Primary School and Sacred Heart College were amalgamated and became St. Mary’s College.

References

External links
St. Mary’s College Seymour
St. Mary's College - Seymour at Education Aust

Private secondary schools in Victoria (Australia)
Private primary schools in Victoria (Australia)
Catholic schools in Victoria (Australia)
Roman Catholic Archdiocese of Melbourne
Educational institutions established in 1900
1900 establishments in Australia